Lake Township is the name of three townships in the U.S. state of Indiana:

 Lake Township, Allen County, Indiana
 Lake Township, Kosciusko County, Indiana
 Lake Township, Newton County, Indiana

See also
 Lake Township (disambiguation)

Indiana township disambiguation pages